The following are the records of Kazakhstan in Olympic weightlifting. Records are maintained in each weight class for the snatch lift, clean and jerk lift, and the total for both lifts by the Weightlifting Federation of the Republic of Kazakhstan (WFRK).

Men

Women

References

External links
WFRK web site

records
Kazakhstan
Olympic weightlifting
weightlifting